Oak Grove High School is a public high school in Midway, North Carolina, which opened in August 2017. The school is a part of the Davidson County Schools system, and is to help with the overcrowded Ledford Senior and North Davidson High Schools.

History 
Oak Grove first came to light in 2012, when the Davidson County Schools Board of Education approved a middle school in the Oak Grove area, to help with overcrowding at North Davidson and Ledford Middle schools. At the time, North Davidson High and Ledford Senior were past max student capacity. The long-awaited news came when the board approved for a new high school to be built near the current Oak Grove Middle School, and a bid was formally accepted in November 2015, for Samet to start construction. Hiring for Oak Grove began in early January 2017, with the posting guidance and athletic staff. Most of the school officially opened to students on August 28, 2017, (excludes the gym, Auxiliary gym, Fine Arts department, auditorium, and athletic facilities). The second half of the building opened on October 2, 2017.

For the first year of the school, it is only open to Freshman and Sophomores, Juniors were added in year two, and Seniors the following year. The "Class of 2020" was Oak Grove's first graduating class, and the "Class of 2021" was the first four-year graduating class.

Feeder schools
Friedberg Elementary 
Midway Elementary 
Wallburg Elementary 
Oak Grove Middle

Athletics
The school is a part of the 3A Mid Piedmont Conference. The 2018–19 school year was the first year the school had a varsity football team. The athletic director for Oak Grove is Stan Smith.

The sports teams of Oak Grove are:
Baseball
Basketball
Cross Country
Golf
Football
Soccer
Softball
Swimming
Tennis
Track and field
Volleyball
Wrestling

Sporting achievements

References

2017 establishments in North Carolina
Educational institutions established in 2017
High schools in Winston-Salem, North Carolina
Public high schools in North Carolina
Schools in Davidson County, North Carolina